Julius August Christoph Zech (24 February 1821 Stuttgart, Germany − 13 July 1864  Berg) was a German astronomer and mathematician.

In 1849, Zech published a table of logarithms; as a result, Zech logarithms for finite fields are named after him.

References

External links
J. Zech biography on mathforum.

19th-century German astronomers
19th-century German mathematicians
1821 births
1864 deaths
Scientists from Stuttgart